Philippe Perret (born 17 October 1961) is a Swiss football manager and former player who played as a defensive midfielder. He spent his entire senior career with Neuchâtel Xamax.

Honours
Neuchâtel Xamax
Swiss Super League: 1986–87, 1987–88
Swiss Super Cup: 1987, 1990

References

1961 births
Living people
Swiss men's footballers
Association football defenders
Switzerland international footballers
Switzerland under-21 international footballers
Swiss Super League players
Neuchâtel Xamax FCS players
Swiss football managers
Yverdon-Sport FC managers
FC Biel-Bienne managers